Chambly—Borduas (also previously known as Chambly and Chambly—Verchères) was a federal electoral district in the province of Quebec, Canada, that was represented in the House of Commons of Canada from 1867 to 1935, and from 1968 to 2015. Created by the British North America Act of 1867, its name was changed in 1893 to "Chambly—Verchères". In 1933, it was amalgamated into the Chambly—Rouville and Richelieu—Verchères electoral districts. The district was re-created in 1966 from Chambly—Rouville, Châteauguay—Huntingdon—Laprairie, and Richelieu—Verchères. Its name was changed in 2003 to "Chambly—Borduas". In 2015, most of the district became part of Beloeil—Chambly, while small parts of it joined Montarville and Pierre-Boucher—Les Patriotes—Verchères.

History

It initially comprised the Parishes of Boucherville, Longueuil, St. Bruno and Chambly.

In 1892, it was redefined to consist of the town of Longueuil, the villages of Verchères, Boucherville, Chambly Basin, Chambly Canton and Varennes, the municipality of St. Lambert, and the parishes of Boucherville, Chambly, Longueuil, St. Basile le Grand, St. Bruno, St. Hubert, Varennes, Ste. Julie, Verchères, Contrecoeur, Ste. Théodosie, St. Antoine, St. Marc and Beloeil.

In 1924, it was redefined to consist of the Counties of Chambly and Verchères including the Cities of Longueuil and St. Lambert.

When it was recreated in 1966, it was defined to consist of:
 the City of Chambly;
 the Towns of Beloeil, Boucherville, Saint-Bruno-de-Montarville and Saint-Hubert;
 the Counties of Chambly and Verchères;
 in the County of Richelieu: the parish municipality of Saint-Roch-de-Richelieu;
 in the County of Laprairie: the municipality of Notre-Dame;
 in the County of Rouville: the village municipality of Richelieu; the parish municipalities of Notre-Dame-de-Bon-Secours and Saint-Mathias.

In 1976, it was redefined to consist of:
 the Cities of Chambly and Saint Hubert;
 the Towns of Carignan, Marieville, Richelieu, and Saint-Bruno-de-Montarville;
 in the County of Rouville: the parish municipalities of Notre-Dame-de-Bon-Secours, Sainte-Marie-de-Monnoir and Saint-Mathias.

In 1987, it was redefined to consist of:
 the towns of Beloeil, Carignan, Chambly, Mont-Saint-Hilaire, Otterburn Park, Richelieu, Saint-Basile-le-Grand and Saint-Bruno-de-Montarville;
 in the County of Verchères: the Village Municipality of McMasterville;
 in the County of Rouville: the parish municipalities of Notre-Dame-de-Bon-Secours and Saint-Mathias.

In 1996, it was redefined to consist of:
 the cities of Beloeil, Carignan, Chambly, Marieville, Mont-Saint-Hilaire, Otterburn Park, Richelieu and Saint-Basile-le-Grand;
 the County Regional Municipality of Rouville, excepting: the City of Saint-Césaire; the village municipalities of Ange-Gardien and Rougemont; the parish municipalities of Saint-Ange-Gardien, Saint-Césaire, Saint-Michel-de-Rougemont, Saint-Paul-d'Abbotsford and Sainte-Angèle-de-Monnoir;
 in the County Regional Municipality of La Vallée-du-Richelieu: the Village Municipality of McMasterville; the Municipality of Saint-Mathieu-de-Beloeil.

Geography

This riding is located southwest of Montreal in the Quebec region of Montérégie. The neighbouring ridings are Brossard—La Prairie, Saint-Bruno—Saint-Hubert, Verchères—Les Patriotes, Saint-Hyacinthe—Bagot, Shefford, and Saint-Jean.

Members of Parliament

This riding has elected the following Member of Parliament:

Election results

Chambly—Borduas, 2003–2015

Note: Conservative vote is compared to the total of the Canadian Alliance vote and Progressive Conservative vote in 2000 election.

Chambly, 1966–2003

Chambly—Verchères, 1893–1933

Chambly, 1867–1893

See also
 List of Canadian federal electoral districts
 Past Canadian electoral districts

References

Notes

External links 
 Campaign expense data from Elections Canada
 Riding history from the Library of Parliament
 History of Federal Ridings since 1867: Chambly (1966–2003)
 History of Federal Ridings since 1867: Chambly-Verchères (1893–1933)
 History of Federal Ridings since 1867: Chambly (1867–1893)
 Map of riding archived by Elections Canada

Chambly, Quebec
Former federal electoral districts of Quebec